Chlorhoda rufolivacea is a moth of the subfamily Arctiinae first described by Seitz in 1919. It is found in Colombia.

References

Arctiini